The 1950 Rose Bowl was the 36th edition of the college football bowl game, played at the Rose Bowl in Pasadena, California on Monday, January 2. The sixth-ranked Ohio State Buckeyes, champions of the Big Ten Conference, upset the undefeated #3 California Golden Bears, champions of the Pacific Coast Conference, 17–14.

Ohio State fullback Fred "Curly" Morrison was named the  Player of the Game. Because New Year's Day was on Sunday in 1950, the bowl games were played the following day.

It was the Big Ten's fourth consecutive win in the Rose Bowl, and California's second straight loss.

Scoring
First quarter
No scoring

Second quarter
 Cal – Jim Monachino 7-yard run (Cullom kick)

Third quarter
 OSU – Fred Morrison 1-yard run (Jimmy Hague kick)
 OSU – Jerry Krall 6-yard run (Hague kick)
 Cal – Monachino 40-yard run (Cullom kick)

Fourth quarter
 OSU – Hague 18-yard field goal

Notes
It was a rematch of the 1921 Rose Bowl, the first bowl game for both teams, won by 
 This was the first bowl game to have 100,000 spectators in attendance; the stadium's fourth expansion increased the capacity to 100,983.

References

Rose Bowl
Rose Bowl Game
California Golden Bears football bowl games
Ohio State Buckeyes football bowl games
Rose Bowl
January 1950 sports events in the United States